Parcipromus is a genus of millipedes belonging to the family Xystodesmidae. The species of this genus are found in western North America.

Species
The following species are recognised in the genus Parcipromus:

Parcipromus cooki 
Parcipromus gigantoarboricolus 
Parcipromus tiemanni

References

Xystodesmidae